The National Police of Uruguay is a national and institutional police force of the Republic of Uruguay, founded on December 18, 1829. It depends on the Executive Power through the Ministry of the Interior. Its main mission is to protect the free exercise of rights and freedoms, guarantee order, internal security, ensure compliance with the laws, assist and protect people, prevent the commission of crimes, ensure security in public places and events, repress behaviors that constitute crimes and misdemeanors.

Creation 
On December 18, 1829, the Constitutional and Legislative Assembly of the Eastern State created the office of Political Chief in each of the nine departments. Standing as Political and Police Chief in the whole national territory, Colonel Don Ignacio Oribe. The 18 of December 1829 has been instituted by law, like historical - legal date of "creation of the Uruguayan National Police".

Structure 
The Director of the National Police is the fourth in command in the Ministry of the Interior and has as his essential task the professional operational command of the National Police.

The following police units depend on the National Police Directorate:

 National Directorate of Police Education (Dirección Nacional de la Educación Policial) 
 National Aviation Directorate of the National Police (Dirección Nacional de Aviación de la Policía Nacional)
 National Directorate of Gender Policies (Dirección Nacional de Políticas de Género)
 National Directorate of Police Health (Dirección Nacional de Sanidad Policial)
 National Directorate of Police Assistance and Social Security (Dirección Nacional de Asistencia y Seguridad Social Policial)
 National Fire Department (Dirección Nacional de Bomberos)
 National Rehabilitation Institute (Instituto Nacional de Rehabilitación)
 National Directorate of Support for the Released (Dirección Nacional de Apoyo al Liberado)
 National Directorate of Civil Identification (Dirección Nacional de Identificación Civil)
 National Directorate of Migration (Dirección Nacional de Migración)
 National Highway Police Directorate (Dirección Nacional de Policía de Caminera)
 National Scientific Police Directorate (Dirección Nacional de Policía Científica)
 Directorate of Investigations of the National Police - DIPN (Dirección de Investigaciones de la Policía Nacional - DIPN)
 General Directorate for the Fight against Organized Crime and INTERPOL (Dirección General de Lucha contra el Crimen Organizado e INTERPOL) 
 General Directorate for the Repression of Illicit Drug Trafficking (Dirección General de Represión al Tráfico Ilícito de Drogas)
 General Directorate of Police Information and Intelligence (Dirección General de Información e Inteligencia Policial)
 National Directorate Republican Guard (Dirección Nacional Guardia Republicana)

Equipment

Ground vehicles 
 

Commonly used vehicles:

Motorcycles 
Commonly used motorbikes:

Aircraft units 

The unit's current inventory includes the following:

Weapons 

Firearms used by the National Police in its different departments:

Uniform 
The daily work uniform consists of dark blue cloth combat pants with a dark blue shirt or a long-sleeved button-down shirt, black boots, a plain baseball cap with the national police logo and the bulletproof vest on top. Officers may also wear a reflective vest or winter jacket that says "police" on the back.

Other equipment 

Some officers also have body cameras.

Gallery

References

External links 
 Ministerio del Interior de la República Oriental del Uruguay
 Jefatura de Policía de Montevideo
 Jefatura de Policía de Colonia
 Dirección Nacional de Bomberos
 Dirección Nacional de Sanidad Policial

Uruguay
Law enforcement in Uruguay
Law enforcement agencies in South America